Sadies is a genus of African jumping spiders that was first described by F. R. Wanless in 1984.

Species
 it contains five species, found only in Africa:
Sadies castanea Ledoux, 2007 – Réunion
Sadies fulgida Wanless, 1984 (type) – Seychelles
Sadies gibbosa Wanless, 1984 – Seychelles
Sadies seychellensis Wanless, 1984 – Seychelles
Sadies trifasciata Wanless, 1984 – Seychelles

References

Salticidae genera
Fauna of Seychelles
Salticidae
Spiders of Africa
Fauna of Réunion